Mohamed Abdel-Samiea (born 30 January 1955) is an Egyptian football manager.

References

1955 births
Living people
Egyptian football managers
Al Mokawloon Al Arab SC managers
Egyptian Premier League managers